Stuart Hetley Price (14 June 1922 – 15 March 1977) was the inaugural Bishop of Doncaster who was later translated to Ripon.

Educated at Corpus Christi College, Cambridge he was ordained in 1945. His first post was as Curate at St Michael and All Angels, Bournemouth, after which he was Domestic Chaplain to the Bishop of Manchester. He was then successively Secretary to the SCM; Rector of Didsbury; a Canon Residentiary at Manchester Cathedral and, his final post before elevation to the episcopate, Archdeacon of Manchester. He died, following complications brought on by a stroke, in March 1977. His son Simon Price (1954–2011) became a historian of ancient Roman religion.

References

1922 births
1977 deaths
Alumni of Corpus Christi College, Cambridge
Bishops of Doncaster
Bishops of Ripon (modern diocese)
Archdeacons of Manchester
20th-century Church of England bishops